Moskva class may refer to:

  (Project 1123), a Soviet anti-submarine warfare carrier class
 , a Soviet icebreaker class; see List of icebreakers
  (Project 21900), a Russian icebreaker class; see List of icebreakers
  river passenger ship; see  WikiCommons

See also
 , whose lead ship was renamed to Moskva after being refitted
 Moskva (ship), several ships of the name
 Moskva (disambiguation)